Alison Grant (born 9 August 1961) is an association football player who represented New Zealand.

Grant made her Football Ferns 3–3 draw with Australia on 18 May 1980, and finished her international career with 37 caps and 11 goals to her credit.

References

1961 births
Living people
New Zealand women's association footballers
New Zealand women's international footballers
Women's association footballers not categorized by position
New Zealand women's national football team managers